Michel Vonk (born 28 October 1968) is a Dutch football manager and former professional footballer

As a player, he was a defender from 1986 to 2001, notably playing in the Premier League for Manchester City. He also played in England for Oldham Athletic and Sheffield United, as well as also playing in his native land for AZ, SVV Dordrecht and MVV Maastricht. Since 2011 Vonk has managed several times in Dutch football with stints at both Sparta Rotterdam and Telstar.

Playing career
Vonk played as centre back and began his career in 1986 with AZ '67 for whom he played 111 times and scored 8 goals. He transferred to SVV Dordrecht in 1991 and played 51 times for the team scoring 1 goal. Then in 1992 he transferred to Manchester City F.C. where he enjoyed three successful seasons playing a total of 91 league games for the club, scoring 4 times. He had been brought in by then City manager Peter Reid costing £500,000. He formed a successful partnership with Keith Curle in the centre of the City defence. In 1995, he criticised then City manager Brian Horton in the News of the World which earned him a suspension and being fined 2 weeks wages.

Subsequent City manager Alan Ball sold the player to Oldham Athletic for £350,000, where he played 5 times and scored 1 goal. He was then transferred to Sheffield United where he played until 1998. He played 37 times for the Blades scoring twice. His time with the club was hampered by injuries. In 1998, he returned to the Netherlands and began playing for MVV Maastricht. His injuries continued however and he was released by the club when they were relegated.

Coaching career
After retiring from active football, Vonk became a youth coach for PSV. He successively served as assistant to Wiljan Vloet at Sparta Rotterdam for two seasons.

In April 2011 Vonk agreed to return at Sparta as head coach for the 2011–12 season under supervision of newly appointed technical director Wiljan Vloet, who accepted to return at the Rotterdam club after two seasons as trainer of NEC Nijmegen.He was fired after one season. In July 2014, he started working for Telstar.

He later worked as assistant manager of SC Heerenveen under Jurgen Streppel, but left the club in 2019 when his contract was not renewed.

References

External links

1968 births
Living people
Sportspeople from Alkmaar
Association football defenders
Expatriate footballers in England
Dutch footballers
Dutch expatriate footballers
Manchester City F.C. players
Oldham Athletic A.F.C. players
Sheffield United F.C. players
Eredivisie players
Eerste Divisie players
Premier League players
English Football League players
Dutch football managers
Sparta Rotterdam managers
SC Telstar managers
SC Heerenveen non-playing staff
AZ Alkmaar non-playing staff
Footballers from North Holland